Rhus virens is a species of flowering plant in the mango family, Anacardiaceae, that is native to Arizona, southern New Mexico, and Texas in the United States as well as northern and central Mexico as far south as Oaxaca.
It is commonly known as the evergreen sumac or tobacco sumac.

Varieties
Rhus virens var. choriophylla (Wooton & Standl.) L.D.Benson – Mearns' sumac
Rhus virens var. virens

References

Further reading

External links

virens
Plants described in 1850
Trees of the Southwestern United States
Trees of Chihuahua (state)
Trees of Hidalgo (state)
Trees of the South-Central United States
Trees of Northeastern Mexico
Trees of Oaxaca
Trees of Puebla
Flora without expected TNC conservation status
Flora of the Sierra Madre Occidental
Flora of the Sierra Madre Oriental
Flora of the Sierra Madre de Oaxaca